The second Minnesota Legislature first convened on December 7, 1859. The 37 members of the Minnesota Senate and the 80 members of the Minnesota House of Representatives were elected during the General Election of October 11, 1859.

Sessions 
The legislature met in a regular session from December 7, 1859 to March 12, 1860. There were no special sessions of the second legislature.

Party summary 
Resignations and new members are discussed in the "Membership changes" section, below.

Senate

House of Representatives

Leadership

Senate 
Lieutenant Governor
Until January 2, 1860 William Holcombe (D-Stillwater)
Since January 2, 1860 Ignatius L. Donnelly (R-Nininger)

House of Representatives 
Speaker of the House
Amos Coggswell (R-Aurora)

Members

Senate

House of Representatives

Membership changes

Senate

House of Representatives

Standing committees

Senate

Notes

References 

 Minnesota Legislators Past & Present - Session Search Results (Session 2, Senate)
 Minnesota Legislators Past & Present - Session Search Results (Session 2, House)

02nd
1850s in Minnesota
1860s in Minnesota